The Chang-Gu World Trade Center, also known as Grand 50 Tower, is a  tall skyscraper in Sanmin District of Kaohsiung, Taiwan. It was completed in 1992 and was designed by C.Y. Lee & Partners. It was the first building in Taiwan to reach a height of 50 floors, as is highlighted by its alternative name.

History
After its completion in 1992, the Chang-Gu World Trade Center became the tallest building in Taiwan surpassing the 169.8 meters high Asia-Pacific Financial Plaza in Kaohsiung. However, it only kept this title for 6 months when the Shin Kong Life Tower in Taipei was completed on 21 December 1993. It kept the title as the tallest building in Kaohsiung for 5 years until the completion of the Tuntex Sky Tower in 1997. The building is currently the 188th tallest building in the world and 5th tallest in Taiwan.

The building follows a Chinese pagoda style and has an octagonal base to be stable against high winds which are typical in Taiwan as it is prone to typhoons. It was also tested to withstand earthquakes which are commonplace in Taiwan.

The buildings crown follows the same perimeter as the rest of the building however it stands on an elaborate, thin base. The underside of the crown is lit up at night however the rest is not. The top is home to the Grand 50 Club which is managed by the Peninsula Group based in Hong Kong. The Grand 50 Club is known as a prestigious night-spot.

The building contains a car park with 280 spaces available. This located underneath the building, covering five underground floors. The atrium is 21 stories high and is clad in Spanish granite. At the top of the building is a helicopter pad.

Transportation
The building is accessible within walking distance North East from Kaohsiung Station of the Kaohsiung MRT or Taiwan Railway Administration.

See also
 85 Sky Tower
 List of tallest buildings in Kaohsiung
 List of tallest buildings in Taiwan

External links

 Emporis.com - Building ID: 122156
 Skyscraperpage.com
 2Bangkok.com - Pictures available on site.
 Turner Construction - involved in the construction of the tower.

1992 establishments in Taiwan
Office buildings completed in 1992
Skyscraper office buildings in Kaohsiung
World Trade Centers